Ameiva praesignis, known as giant ameiva and Amazon racerunner, is a species of teiid lizard found in Costa Rica, Panama, Venezuela, and Colombia.

References

Ameiva
Reptiles described in 1852
Taxa named by Spencer Fullerton Baird
Taxa named by Charles Frédéric Girard
Lizards of South America